Mike Doughty (born December 2, 1936) is a former Kenyan rally co-driver best known for competing with Shekhar Mehta in the 1970s.

External links 
 Driver profile, Rallybase.nl

1936 births
Living people
World Rally Championship co-drivers
Kenyan rally co-drivers